Shelby Rogers was the defending champion, but chose not to participate.

Madison Brengle won the title, defeating Robin Anderson in the final, 6–2, 6–4.

Seeds

Draw

Finals

Top half

Bottom half

Qualifying

Seeds

Qualifiers

Qualifying draw

First qualifier

Second qualifier

Third qualifier

Fourth qualifier

References

External Links
Main Draw
Qualifying Draw

Dow Tennis Classic - Singles